Turuçu is a Brazilian municipality in the southeastern part of the state of Rio Grande do Sul. It is nicknamed the National Capital of the Chili Pepper (Capital Nacional da Pimenta Vermelha). The population is 3,423 (2020 est.) in an area of 253.64 km². The name comes from a local Native American language. It lies close to the Lagoa dos Patos, a lagoon connected with the Atlantic Ocean.

References

External links
 Official website of the prefecture
http://www.citybrazil.com.br/rs/turucu/ 

Municipalities in Rio Grande do Sul
Pelotas (micro-region)